Live script may refer to:

 Live Script, a scripting capability of MATLAB
 LiveScript, a programming language that transpiles to JavaScript
 LiveScript, the beta name of JavaScript (only for a few months in 1995)